John Neville Creighton (10 March 1937 – 6 April 2022) was a New Zealand rugby union player. A hooker, Creighton represented  at a provincial level in over 100 games. He was a member of the New Zealand national side, the All Blacks, in 1962, appearing in six matches including one international.

Creighton studied law, and earned his LLB at the University of Canterbury. He was admitted to the bar in 1962, and as of 2017 was still practising as a lawyer in Christchurch. Creighton died in Christchurch on 6 April 2022.

References

1937 births
2022 deaths
People from Rotherham, New Zealand
People educated at Christchurch Boys' High School
University of Canterbury alumni
New Zealand rugby union players
New Zealand international rugby union players
Canterbury rugby union players
Rugby union hookers
Rugby union players from Canterbury, New Zealand